|
Graziano Cioni (born Empoli, 17 November 1946) is an Italian politician.

Political career 
He was deputy to the House in the 12th legislature of the Italian Senate.

As an insurer, he continuously held government affairs in the Florentine public administration since the early 1970s. Already in 1975 he was provincial councillor, from 1980 to 1983 he was a councillor for staff at the Giunta Gabbuggiani and in 1985 he was municipal councillor at Annona in Giunta Bogianckino. In 1987 he became Advisor on transport until 1990 in Giunta Morales, and again appointed Police Councillor Municipal Council in 1999, at the Domenici Charge until 2009.

Councillor of the City of Florence 
At the Municipal Council of Florence he held the following assignments:
 Public health and socio-sanitary integration
 Society of Health
 Public hygiene
 Social Security
 IPAB
 Security and Urban Viability
 Municipal police
 Safe city
 Occupation and public land alterations for roadmaps
 Coordination of works and demonstrations for roadside profiles
 Road maintenance and public areas
 Furnishings and urban decor

After withdrawal 
After his retirement he started a series of journalistic collaborations with La Nazione and RTV 38. In 2011 he signed an autobiographical book. In July 2016 he became part of the Filippo Turati Onlus Foundation board of directors, standing legal institution in 1968 by the President of Italy Giuseppe Saragat, whose registered office is located in Pistoia and which also operates in Pistoia mountain (Gavinana), Vieste (Foggia, Gargano promontory) and Zagarolo (Rome).

Disputes 
In November 2008, Mr Cioni, as well as a candidate for Mayor of Florence, was indicted with the allegation of corruption together with the entrepreneur Salvatore Ligresti and the urban planning director Gianni Biagi regarding the urban development of 'Castle area north of Florence, owned by the Fondiaria Sai Insurance Group. In March 2013, together with the other suspects, he was acquitted of corruption. He was then sentenced, along with the other defendants, to 1 year and 1 month imprisonment.

In May 2016, the Supreme court annulled without delay the convictions imposed by the Court of Appeal of Florence for corruption on the urban transformation of the Castello area.

References 

1946 births
Living people
Democratic Party of the Left politicians
Democrats of the Left politicians
People from Empoli